Guioa pauciflora is a species of plant in the family Sapindaceae. It is found in Indonesia (Western New Guinea) and Papua New Guinea.

References

pauciflora
Flora of New Guinea
Vulnerable plants
Taxonomy articles created by Polbot